Aquimarina hainanensis  is a Gram-negative, non-spore-forming, long rod-shaped, and non-motile bacterium from the genus of Aquimarina which has been isolated from the shrimp larvae Litopenaeus vannamei.

References

External links
Type strain of Aquimarina hainanensis at BacDive -  the Bacterial Diversity Metadatabase

Flavobacteria
Bacteria described in 2016